The Cleveland Crunch are an American professional indoor soccer club located in Cleveland, Ohio competing as a charter member of the  Major League Indoor Soccer (MLIS). The rebranded Crunch returned to indoor play as a member of the MASL 2 in March 2021.   

Formed in 1989 as an expansion team in the Major Indoor Soccer League (MISL), the Crunch played a total of 16 seasons in three separate leagues under two different names.  The team played three seasons in the original MISL, later known as the Major Soccer League (MSL), before joining the rival National Professional Soccer League (NPSL) in 1992.  After nine seasons in the NPSL, the team joined a second incarnation of the Major Indoor Soccer League (MISL) in 2001. In 2002, the team was rebranded the Cleveland Force in honor of the former team of the same name.  After four seasons in the second MISL, the team folded in 2005. The Crunch returned to indoor play in the M2 for the 2021 season. On July 18, 2021 the Crunch defeated the Wichita Wings by a final score of 11-6 to win the league championship.

History
The original Cleveland Force team had folded on July 22, 1988.  Akron businessmen George S. Hoffman and Stuart Lichter formed an ownership group; named Al Miller general manager; and named former Force star Kai Haaskivi player-coach. Miller and Haaskivi brought back many players who had been fan favorites during the Force's height of popularity in the mid-1980s. The Crunch's home arena was originally the Richfield Coliseum.

Near the end of the Crunch's first season, Miller engineered a trade that would help Cleveland make the championship finals in seven of the next 10 years. He sent veteran forward Paul Wright to the San Diego Sockers for Zoran Karic, a feisty forward who immediately hit it off with Cleveland star Hector Marinaro. Within weeks, they were dubbed the "Dynamic Duo" and together rewrote the scoring record books for the next decade.

When the original MISL ceased operation in the summer of 1992, the Crunch, Baltimore and Wichita joined the rival NPSL as "expansion teams". All were permitted to keep only six players, then fill the rest of their rosters in an expansion draft of players made available by other NPSL teams. The NPSL, in an effort to promote the sport in the United States, had a cap of two non-Americans allowed on a roster. Canadian-born Marinaro and Serbia native Karic filled that quota immediately. Besides Marinaro and Karic, holdovers from the MISL Crunch were midfielders Tommy Tanner and Andy Schmetzer, defender George Fernandez and young goalkeeper Otto Orf.

Orf had only a 14–32 record the previous three years with the club as backup to P.J. Johns. Before switching leagues, Miller had signed four-time NPSL goalkeeper of the year Jamie Swanner from the Canton Invaders. That contract was voided when the Crunch entered the NPSL. Swanner and several ex-Invaders signed as free agents with another expansion team, the Buffalo Blizzard. New Crunch coach Gary Hindley wanted Orf as his starter, citing the big keeper's strong throwing arm as an offensive weapon. He wanted Orf getting the ball to Marinaro and Karic with outlet passes at the team's new home, the CSU Convocation Center, where the playing surface was considerably smaller than at the Richfield Coliseum.

Orf became a 25-game winner, Marinaro and Karic shattered all scoring records, and Cleveland advanced to the league finals, where it lost to the Kansas City Attack, three games to two. A year later, the Crunch finally broke through to win Cleveland's first championship in any pro sport in 30 years. Marinaro scored the dramatic game-winner in double overtime as Cleveland overcame a 15–10 deficit to defeat the visiting St. Louis Ambush, 17–15, to take the series, three games to one.

Lichter faded from view when the MISL folded and Hoffman became even more active as owner during the Crunch's almost yearly run to the finals. Hoffman eventually sold his interest to a Cleveland group headed by Richard Dietrich. Soon after, the NPSL reorganized itself as the new Major Indoor Soccer League in 2001. The team took on the old Cleveland Force name in 2002.

Team honors
League championships
 1993–94 NPSL Champions
 1995–96 NPSL Champions
 1998–99 NPSL Champions
 2021 MASL2 Champions
Division titles (Regular Season)
 1990–91 MSL Eastern Division
 1994–95 NPSL American Division
 1995–96 NPSL American Division
 1996–97 NPSL Central Division
 1998–99 NPSL Central Division
 1999-00 NPSL Central Division
 2021-22 M2 Great Lakes Division 

Division/Conference titles (Playoffs)
1991 MSL Eastern Division
1993 NPSL American Division
1994 NPSL American Division
1996 NPSL American Division
1997 NPSL American Conference
1999 NPSL American Conference
2000 NPSL American Conference

Individual honors
Most Valuable Player Award
 1992–93 Hector Marinaro
 1993–94 Zoran Karic
 1994–95 Hector Marinaro
 1995–96 Hector Marinaro (shared with Milwaukee's Victor Nogueira)
 1996–97 Hector Marinaro
 1998–99 Hector Marinaro
 1999-00 Hector Marinaro

Scoring Champions
 1991–92 Zoran Karic, 102 points in 37 games
 1992–93 Hector Marinaro, 248 points in 38 games
 1993–94 Zoran Karic, 267 points in 36 games
 1994–95 Hector Marinaro, 255 points in 32 games
 1995–96 Hector Marinaro, 247 points in 33 games
 1996–97 Hector Marinaro, 265 points in 36 games
 1997–98 Hector Marinaro, 212 points in 36 games
 1998–99 Hector Marinaro, 195 points in 34 games
 1999–00 Hector Marinaro, 231 points in 38 games
 2000–01 Hector Marinaro, 161 points in 34 games

All-Star Game MVP
 1993 game in Cleveland, Zoran Karic
 1995 game in Buffalo, Zoran Karic (shared with Kansas City's Brian Haynes)
 1999 game in Wichita, Zoran Karic
 2001 game in Buffalo, John Ball

Rookie of the Year Award
 1991–92 Tommy Tanner
 1994–95 Henry Gutierrez

All-Rookie Team
 1991–92 Tommy Tanner, 1st team
 1993–94 Troy Dayak, 2nd team
 1994–95 Scott Schweitzer, 1st team
 1994–95 Henry Gutierrez, 1st team
 1995–96 Todd Dusosky, 2nd team
 1996–97 John Ball, 1st team
 1997–98 Shawn Boney, 2nd team
 1997–98 Bo Simic, 2nd team
 2001–02 Marco Reda, 1st team
 2001–02 Justin Evans, 1st team

Head coaches
 Kai Haaskivi (1989–90) 29–50, .367
 Trevor Dawkins (1990–92) 40–25, .615; Playoffs: 8–11, .421
 Gary Hindley (1992–95) 78–42, .650; Playoffs: 15–12, .555
 Bruce Miller (1995-01) 149–87, .631; Playoffs: 27–18, .600
 George Fernandez (2001) 3–5, .375
 Mike Pilger (2001–02) 17–31, .354
 Andy Schmetzer (2002–04) 33–38, .465;  Playoffs: 0–2 .000
 Omid Namazi (2004–05) 23–16, .590; Playoffs: 2–2 .500
 Louis Kastelic (2020-22) 19-3 .864; Playoffs: 3-1 .750
 Benny Dargle (2022-present) TBA

Arenas
 Richfield Coliseum 1989–92
 CSU Convocation Center 1992-05
 Soccer Sportsplex 2020-present
 I-X Center 2022-2023

Year-by-year

Playoffs
1990–91
MSL Eastern Division Finals: Defeated Kansas City Comets, 4–3 
MSL Championship Series: Lost to San Diego Sockers, 4–2
1991–92
MSL Semifinals: Lost to Dallas Sidekicks, 4–2
1992–93
NPSL American Division Semifinals: Defeated Buffalo Blizzard, 2–1 
NPSL American Division Finals: Defeated Harrisburg Heat, 2–1
NPSL Championship Series: Lost to Kansas City Attack, 3–2
1993–94
NPSL American Division Semifinals: Defeated Buffalo Blizzard, 2–1
NPSL American Division Finals: Defeated Harrisburg Heat, 2–1
NPSL Championship Series: Defeated St. Louis Ambush, 3–1
1994–95
NPSL American Division Semifinals: Defeated Buffalo Blizzard, 2–1
NPSL American Division Finals: Lost to Harrisburg Heat, 3–0
1995–96
NPSL American Division Semifinals: Defeated Buffalo Blizzard, 2–1
NPSL American Division Finals: Defeated Baltimore Spirit, 3–1
NPSL Championship Series: Defeated Kansas City Attack, 4–2
1996–97
NPSL American Conference Semifinals: Defeated Baltimore Spirit, 2–1
NPSL American Conference Finals: Defeated Harrisburg Heat, 3–1
NPSL Championship Series: Lost to Kansas City Attack, 4–0
1997–98
NPSL American Conference Semifinals: Lost to Philadelphia Kixx, 2–0
1998–99
NPSL American Conference Semifinals: Defeated Montreal Impact, 2–1
NPSL American Conference Finals: Defeated Philadelphia Kixx, 2–0
NPSL Championship Series: Defeated St. Louis Ambush, 3–2
1999–2000
NPSL American Conference Semifinals: Defeated Montreal Impact, 2–0
NPSL American Conference Finals: Defeated Baltimore Blast, 2–0
NPSL Championship Series: Lost to Milwaukee Wave, 3–2
2002–03
MISL Eastern Conference Semifinals: Lost to Baltimore Blast 1–0
2003–04
MISL Eastern Conference Quarterfinals: Lost to Dallas Sidekicks 1–0
2004–05
MISL Semifinals: Defeated Philadelphia Kixx 2–0
MISL Finals: Lost to Milwaukee Wave 2–0
2021
MASL2 Semifinals: Defeated FC Amarillo Bombers 12–6
MASL2 Finals: Defeated Wichita Wings 11–6
2021-22
MASL2 Semifinals: Defeated Muskingun Risers 6-5
MASL2 Finals: Lost to San Diego Sockers2 4-7

References

External links
 Cleveland Crunch official website
 Cleveland's first sports championship since the 1964 Browns

1989 establishments in Ohio

Major Indoor Soccer League (1978–1992) teams
Major Indoor Soccer League (2001–2008) teams
National Professional Soccer League (1984–2001) teams
Soccer clubs in Ohio
Soccer clubs in Cleveland
Association football clubs established in 1989